The Vale of Dedham is an 1828 oil painting by the English painter John Constable which depicts Dedham Vale on the Essex-Suffolk border in eastern England. It is in the permanent collection of the Scottish National Gallery, Edinburgh.

The view from Gun Hill along the River Stour to Dedham village and the distant Stour estuary was a favourite subject of Constable which he painted several times, most noticeably the 1802 version in the Victoria and Albert Museum.

In this work the paint is thickly applied with touches of white to emphasise the reflection of sunlight. The work was primarily responsible for his admission to the prestigious Royal Academy of Arts in 1829.

See also
 Dedham Vale, 1802, Victoria and Albert Museum
 Dedham Vale, 1802, Yale Center for British Art
 Dedham Vale, 1802, Kōriyama City Museum of Art, Koriyama, Japan
 Dedham Vale, 1810, Dayton Art Institute

References

1828 paintings
Paintings by John Constable
Landscape paintings
Paintings in the National Galleries of Scotland
England in art